Ghummanwala is a village in Jhang District in the Punjab province of Pakistan.  Nearby towns are Lodhranwala and Khokra. By road, Shorkot is connected to Garh Moor, Garh Maharaja and Kot Islam.

References 

Populated places in Jhang District